The 2018 League of Legends World Championship was an esports tournament for the multiplayer online battle arena video game League of Legends. It was the eighth iteration of the League of Legends World Championship, an annual international tournament organized by the game's developer, Riot Games. It was held from October 1 to November 3, 2018, in cities across South Korea. Twenty four teams qualified for the tournament based on their placement in regional circuits such as those in China, South Korea, Europe, and North America, with twelve of those teams having to reach the group stage via a play-in round. The tournament became known for its very surprising results, numerous upsets, and has often been considered the most unpredictable worlds in League of Legends' history. The tournament also became the most watched esports event in history, reaching a peak of over 200 million concurrent viewers during the finals. It surpassed the viewership of the 2017 League of Legends World Championship, as well as the peak viewership of numerous worldwide sporting events including the Super Bowl.

The tournament's opening ceremony received significant attention, with over 90 million concurrent viewers tuning in for the performance. A virtual K-pop group named K/DA was unveiled by Riot Games during the ceremony, with Soyeon and Miyeon from (G)I-dle, Madison Beer and Jaira Burns representing the group as its human counterpart and in the live performance of the finals. K/DA topped global music charts after the initial release of their debut song "Pop/Stars", receiving considerable attention online and raking in one of the fastest viewership records for its music video on YouTube. A dance practice video of "Pop/Stars", as popular in the K-pop scene, was also released. "RISE" is the tournament's theme song, put together by The Glitch Mob, Mako and The Word Alive. A remix version of "RISE" featuring Bobby from IKON was also released shortly after, with the song being performed on the tournament's finals by all the involved music groups and artists.

The victory of China's Invictus Gaming over Europe's Fnatic in the tournament's finals marked the first time in League of Legends history that the LPL (China) as a region won the world championship, as well as the first time a non-LCK (Korean) team has won after five consecutive years of prior Korean winners. The final series is also the fastest world championship finals in history at 85 minutes total game time. Gao “Ning” Zhenning was awarded the MVP of the finals due to his outstanding performance and contributions during the series, marking the first time a jungle position player has won a world championship MVP.

Qualified teams 
Although the South Korea (LCK) representative, Kingzone DragonX, lost to China's (LPL) representative Royal Never Give Up (LPL) in 2018 Mid-Season Invitational (MSI) Finals, all three teams from South Korea (LCK) started in the Main Group Stage, having won the 2017 Mid-Season Invitational and the previous two World Championships. With the results of 2018 MSI and following their separation from the rest of the Southeast Asian (SEA) region, Vietnam (VCS) had a direct seed into the Main Group Stage for the summer split victor in their region, but unlike the previous year, Vietnam had no additional slots in the Play-In Stage for their summer runner-up team, because of the 24 team limit. The North American (NA LCS) summer split champion team was seeded to Pool 2 due to their performance at the 2018 Mid-Season Invitational.

Rosters

Venues 
Seoul, Busan, Gwangju, Incheon were the four cities chosen to host the competition.

Play-in Stage 

 Venue: LOL PARK, Gran Seoul 3F, Seoul.
 Date and time: October 1–4, started from 17:00 KST (UTC+09:00)

Round 1

 Twelve teams are drawn in four groups, with three teams each group.
Double round robin, all matches are best-of-one.
If teams have same win–loss record and head to head, they will play a tiebreaker match for 1st or 2nd place.
 The top two teams of each group advance to round 2. The 3rd-place team is eliminated.

Group A

Group B

Group C

Group D

Round 2 
 Eight teams are drawn randomly into a single-elimination match, with 1st-place teams of each group facing 2nd-place teams of another group. 
 All matches are best-of-five.
 The 1st-place team chooses the side for all odd-numbered games, while the 2nd-place team chooses the side of even-numbered games.
 The winner advances to the main group stage.

Match 1 
 Date and time: October 6, 13:00 KST (UTC+09:00).

Match 2 
 Date and time: October 6, 17:00 KST (UTC+09:00).

Match 3 
 Date and time: October 7, 13:00 KST (UTC+09:00).

Match 4 
 Date and time: October 7, 17:00 KST (UTC+09:00).

Group stage 
 Venue: BEXCO Auditorium, Busan.
 Date and time: October 10–17, started from 17:00 KST (UTC+09:00).
 Sixteen teams are drawn in four groups with four teams per group. Teams of same region cannot be placed in the same group.
Double round robin, all matches are best-of-one.
If teams have the same win–loss record and head-to-head record, a tiebreaker match is played. 
 The top two teams of each group advance to Knockout Stage. The bottom two teams are eliminated.

Group A

Group B

Group C

Group D

Knock-out Stage 

 Eight teams are drawn into a best-of-five single elimination bracket.
The 1st-place team of each group is drawn against the 2nd-place team of another group.
Teams of the same group can not play each other until the finals.
 All matches are best-of-five.

Quarterfinals 

 Venue: BEXCO Auditorium, Busan.
The 1st-place team chooses the side for all odd-numbered games, while the 2nd-place team chooses the side of even-numbered games.
Winner advances to the semifinals.

Match 1 
 Date and time: October 20, 13:00 KST (UTC+09:00).

Match 2 
 Date and time: October 20, 17:00 KST (UTC+09:00).

Match 3 
 Date and time: October 21, 13:00 KST (UTC+09:00).

Match 4 
 Date and time: October 21, 17:00 KST (UTC+09:00).

Semifinals 

 Venue: Gwangju Women's University Universiade Gymnasium, Gwangju.
The winner advances to the finals.

Match 1 
 Date and time: October 27, 17:00 KST (UTC+09:00).

Match 2 
 Date and time: October 28, 17:00 KST (UTC+09:00).

Finals 

 Venue: Incheon Munhak Stadium, Incheon.
 Date and time: November 3, 17:00 KST (UTC+09:00).
 The members of the winning team will lift the Summoner's Cup, earning their title as the League of Legends 2018 World Champions.

Ranking

Team ranking 

 (*) Does not include tiebreaker games.

Regional ranking  

 The win-ratio is determined by number of won games compared the number of games played.
Bracket stage wins are prioritized. 
(*) Does not include tiebreaker games.

References

2018 in South Korean sport
2018 multiplayer online battle arena tournaments
International esports competitions hosted by South Korea
League of Legends World Championship
ESP
ESP
The Game Awards winners